K. Thanaraj (born 3 January 1986 in Seremban, Negeri Sembilan) is a Malaysian footballer.

External links
Malaysian Premier League Team Info 

Living people
1986 births
Malaysian footballers
People from Negeri Sembilan
Negeri Sembilan FA players
Sabah F.C. (Malaysia) players
Johor Darul Ta'zim F.C. players
Felda United F.C. players
Selangor FA players
Malaysia Super League players
Malaysian people of Tamil descent
Malaysian sportspeople of Indian descent
Association football wingers